Casey Dellacqua was the defending champion, having won the event in 2013, however she chose not to participate.

Liu Fangzhou won the title, defeating fifth seed Risa Ozaki in the final, 6–4, 6–3.

Seeds

Main draw

Finals

Top half

Bottom half

References 
 Main draw

Bendigo Women's International 2 - Singles